Franz Schubert's compositions of 1828 are mostly in the Deutsch catalogue (D) range D 936A–965B, and include:
 Instrumental works:
 Symphony No. 9, D 944 (completed in 1828)
 Symphony No. 10, D 936A
 String Quintet, D 956
 Fantasia in F minor for piano four-hands, D 940
 Three last piano sonatas, D. 958–960
 Vocal music:
 Mass No. 6, D 950
 Schwanengesang, D 957
 "The Shepherd on the Rock", D 965

Table

Legend

List

|-
| 615
| data-sort-value="936.1" | 936A
| data-sort-value="ZZZZ" |
| data-sort-value="ZZZZ" |
| data-sort-value="506,11" | V, 6 No. 11& Anh. 2
| data-sort-value="Symphony No. 10" | Symphony No. 10
| data-sort-value="key D major" | D major
| data-sort-value="1828-03-21" | spring–summer1828?
| Sketches for [Allegro maestoso] (two versions) – Andante – Scherzo (two versions)
|-
| 937
| 937
| data-sort-value="XXX,1872" | (1872)
| data-sort-value="2010,602" | XX, 10No. 602
| data-sort-value="414,00" | IV, 14
| Lebensmut, D 937
| data-sort-value="text Frohlicher Lebensmut" | Fröhlicher Lebensmut
| data-sort-value="1828-06-21" | summer1828?
| data-sort-value="Text by Rellstab, Ludwig, Frohlicher Lebensmut" | Text by Rellstab; Fragment
|-
| 938
| 938
| data-sort-value="XXX,1835" | (1835)
| data-sort-value="2009,551" | XX, 9No. 551
| data-sort-value="414,00" | IV, 14
| data-sort-value="Winterabend, D 938, Der" | Der Winterabend, D 938
| data-sort-value="text Es ist so still, so heimlich um mich" | Es ist so still, so heimlich um mich
| data-sort-value="1828-01-01" | January1828
| data-sort-value="Text by Leitner, Karl Gottfried von, Es ist so still, so heimlich um mich" | Text by Leitner
|-
| 939
| 939
| data-sort-value="096,1828-1" | 96,1(1828)
| data-sort-value="2009,552" | XX, 9No. 552
| data-sort-value="405,00" | IV, 5
| data-sort-value="Sterne, Die, D 939" | Die Sterne, D 939
| data-sort-value="text Wie blitzen die Sterne so hell durch die Nacht" | Wie blitzen die Sterne so hell durch die Nacht
| data-sort-value="1828-01-01" | January1828
| data-sort-value="Text by Leitner, Karl Gottfried von, Wie blitzen die Sterne so hell durch die Nacht" | Text by Leitner
|-
| 940
| 940
| data-sort-value="103,1829-0" | 103(1829)
| data-sort-value="0903,024" | IX, 3No. 24
| data-sort-value="713,02" | VII/1, 3 No. 2 & Anh. No. 1
| Fantasy, D 940
| data-sort-value="key F minor" | F minor
| data-sort-value="1828-04-01" | January–April 1828
| For piano duet
|- id="D 941"
| 941
| data-sort-value="999.09480941" | 948
| data-sort-value="ZZZZ" |

| data-sort-value="ZZZZ" |

| data-sort-value="ZZZZ" |

| data-sort-value="ZZZZ" |

| data-sort-value="ZZZZ" |

| data-sort-value="ZZZZ" |

| See , 1st version
|-
| 942
| 942
| data-sort-value="136,1839-0" | 136p(1839)
| data-sort-value="1700,009" | XVIINo. 9
| data-sort-value="302,18" | III, 2bNo. 18
| Mirjams Siegesgesang
| data-sort-value="text Ruhrt die Zimbel, schlagt die Saiten" | Rührt die Zimbel, schlagt die Saiten – Aus ägypten vor dem Volke – Doch der Horizont erdunkelt – S'ist der Herr in seinem Grimme – Tauchst du auf, Pharao? – Drum mit Zimbeln und mit Saiten
| data-sort-value="1828-03-01" | March 1828
| data-sort-value="Text by Grillparzer, Franz, Ruhrt die Zimbel, schlagt die Saiten" | Text by Grillparzer; For sSATB and piano
|-
| 943
| 943
| data-sort-value="119,1829-0" | 119p(1829)
| data-sort-value="2010,568" | XX, 10No. 568
| data-sort-value="414,00" | IV, 14
| Auf dem Strom
| data-sort-value="text Nimm die letzten Abschiedskusse" | Nimm die letzten Abschiedsküsse
| data-sort-value="1828-03-01" | March 1828
| data-sort-value="Text by Rellstab, Ludwig, Nimm die letzten Abschiedskusse" | Text by Rellstab; For voice, horn (or cello) and piano
|-
| data-sort-value="944" | 944849
| 944
| data-sort-value="XXX,1840" | (1840)
| data-sort-value="0102,007" | I, 2No. 7
| data-sort-value="504,08" | V, 4No. 8
| data-sort-value="Symphony No. 09" | Symphony No. 9, Great C major
| data-sort-value="key C major" | C major
| data-sort-value="1828-03-01" | summer1825?–March 1828
| Andante, Allegro ma non troppo – Andante con moto – Scherzo – Allegro vivace; Probably identical to Gmunden-Gastein Symphony, 
|-
| data-sort-value="944.1" | 944A
| data-sort-value="944.1" | 944A
| data-sort-value="ZZZZ" |
| data-sort-value="ZZZZ" |
| data-sort-value="ZZZZ" |
| German Dance, D 944A
| data-sort-value="ZZZZ" |
| data-sort-value="1828-03-01" | 1/3/1828
| For piano; Lost
|-
| 945
| 945
| data-sort-value="XXX,1895" | (1895)
| data-sort-value="2010,589" | XX, 10No. 589
| data-sort-value="414,00" | IV, 14
| Herbst, D 945
| data-sort-value="text Es rauschen die Winde" | Es rauschen die Winde
| data-sort-value="1828-04-01" | April 1828
| data-sort-value="Text by Rellstab, Ludwig, Es rauschen die Winde" | Text by Rellstab
|-
| 946
| 946
| data-sort-value="XXX,1868" | (1868)
| data-sort-value="1100,013" | XI No. 13
| data-sort-value="725,07" | VII/2, 5
| data-sort-value="Piano pieces, 3, D 946" | Three piano pieces, a.k.a. Impromptus, D 946
| data-sort-value="key E-flat minor" | E minor – E major – C major
| data-sort-value="1828-05-01" | May 1828
| Allegro assai, Andante – Allegretto – Allegro
|-
| 947
| 947
| data-sort-value="144,1840-0" | 144p(1840)
| data-sort-value="0903,023" | IX, 3No. 23
| data-sort-value="713,03" | VII/1,3 No. 3
| Allegro, D 947, a.k.a. Lebensstürme
| data-sort-value="key A minor" | A minor
| data-sort-value="1828-05-01" | May 1828
| For piano duet
|- id="D 948"
| data-sort-value="948" | 948941964
| 948
| data-sort-value="XXX,1891" | (1891)154p(1849)
| data-sort-value="1600,042" | XVINo. 42(1st v.)& No. 2(2nd v.)
| data-sort-value="109,015" | I, 9No. 15–16& Anh. 3
| Hymnus an den heiligen Geist
| data-sort-value="text Komm, heil'ger Geist" | Komm, heil'ger Geist, erhöre unser Flehen (1st v.); Herr, unser Gott! erhöre unser Flehen (2nd v.)
| data-sort-value="1828-05-01" | May 1828
|-
| 949
| data-sort-value="999.0639" | 639
| data-sort-value="ZZZZ" |

| data-sort-value="ZZZZ" |

| data-sort-value="ZZZZ" |

| data-sort-value="ZZZZ" |

| data-sort-value="ZZZZ" |

| data-sort-value="ZZZZ" |

| See 
|-
| 950
| 950
| data-sort-value="XXX,1865" | (1865)
| data-sort-value="1302,006" | XIII, 2No. 6
| data-sort-value="104,00" | I, 4
| Mass No. 6
| data-sort-value="key E-flat major" | E majorKyrie – Gloria – Credo – Sanctus & Benedictus – Agnus Dei
| data-sort-value="1828-06-01" | startedJune 1828
| data-sort-value="Text: Mass ordinary 13" | Text: Mass ordinary (other settings: , 31, 45, 49, 56, 66, 105, 167, 324, 452, 678 and 755); For satbSATB and orchestra
|-
| 951
| 951
| data-sort-value="107,1829-0" | 107(1829)
| data-sort-value="0902,013" | IX, 2No. 13
| data-sort-value="713,04" | VII/1, 3 No. 4& Anh. No. 2
| Rondo, D 951, a.k.a. Grand Rondeau
| data-sort-value="A major" | A major
| data-sort-value="1828-06-01" | June 1828
| For piano duet
|-
| 952
| 952
| data-sort-value="152,1848-0" | 152p(1848)
| data-sort-value="0903,028" | IX, 3No. 28
| data-sort-value="713,05" | VII/1,3 No. 5
| data-sort-value="Fugue, D 952" | Fugue, D 952
| data-sort-value="key E minor" | E minor
| data-sort-value="1828-06-03" | 3/6/1828
| For organ duet or piano duet
|- id="D 953"
| 953
| 953
| data-sort-value="XXX,1841" | (1841)
| data-sort-value="1700,019" | XVIINo. 19
| data-sort-value="302,19" | III, 2bNo. 19
| Psalm 92 (91)
| data-sort-value="text Tow l'hodos ladonoj" | tôw l'hôdôs ladônoj
| data-sort-value="1828-07-01" | July 1828
| data-sort-value="Text: Psalm 92" | Text: Psalm 92; For baritone and satbSATB
|-
| 954
| 954
| data-sort-value="XXX,1828" | (1828)
| data-sort-value="1700,005" | XVIINo. 5
| data-sort-value="302,20" | III, 2bNo. 20
| Glaube, Hoffnung und Liebe, D 954
| data-sort-value="text Gott, lass die Glocke glucklich steigen" | Gott, laß die Glocke glücklich steigen
| data-sort-value="1828-09-02" | before2/9/1828
|-
| 955
| 955
| data-sort-value="097,1828-0" | 97(1828)
| data-sort-value="2008,462" | XX, 8No. 462
| data-sort-value="405,00" | IV, 5
| Glaube, Hoffnung und Liebe, D 955
| data-sort-value="text Glaube, hoffe, liebe!" | Glaube, hoffe, liebe!
| data-sort-value="1828-08-01" | August1828
| data-sort-value="Text by Kuffner, Christoph, Gott, lass die Glocke glucklich steigen"| Text by 
|-
| 956
| 956
| data-sort-value="163,1853-0" | 163p(1853)
| data-sort-value="0400,000" | IV No. 1
| data-sort-value="602,02" | VI, 2 No. 2
| String Quintet
| data-sort-value="key C major" | C major
| data-sort-value="1828-09-01" | September1828?
| Allegro ma non troppo – Adagio – Presto – Allegretto; For two violins, viola and two cellos
|-
| data-sort-value="957.01" | 957Nos.1–13
| 957
| data-sort-value="XXX,1829" | (1829)
| data-sort-value="2009,554" | XX, 9Nos.554–566
| data-sort-value="414,00" | IV, 14
| data-sort-value="Schwanengesang, D 957" | Schwanengesang, D 957, a.k.a. 13 Lieder nach Gedichten von Rellstab und Heine:—Rellstab—1. Liebesbotschaft – 2. Kriegers Ahnung – 3. Frühlingssehnsucht – 4. Ständchen – 5. Aufenhalt – 6. In der Ferne – 7. Abschied—Heine—8. Der Atlas – 9. Ihr Bild – 11. Die Stadt – 12. Am Meer – 13. Der Doppelgänger
| data-sort-value="text Rauschendes Bächlein, so silber und hell" | 1. Rauschendes Bächlein, so silber und hell – 2. In tiefer Ruh liegt um mich her – 3. Säuselnde Lüfte wehen so mild – 4. Leise flehen meine Lieder – 5. Rauschender Strom, brausender Wald – 6. Wehe dem Fliehenden – 7. Ade! du muntre, du fröhliche Stadt – 8. Ich unglückselger Atlas – 9. Ich stand in dunkeln Träumen – 10. Das Fischermädchen – 11. Am fernen Horizonte – 12. Das Meer erglänzte weit hinaus – 13. Still ist die Nacht, es ruhen die Gassen
| data-sort-value="1828-09-01" | August–September?1828
| data-sort-value="Text by Rellstab, Ludwig, Frohlicher Lebensmut" | Text by Rellstab (Nos. 1–7) and Heine, H. (Nos. 8–13);  was No. 14; Early versions for Nos. 1 and 3; Variant for No. 4
|-
| 958
| 958
| data-sort-value="XXX,1839" | (1839)
| data-sort-value="1000,013" | X No. 13
| data-sort-value="723,17" | VII/2, 3No. 17
| Piano Sonata, D 958
| data-sort-value="key C minor" | C minor
| data-sort-value="1828-09-01" | September1828
| Allegro – Adagio – Minuet – Allegro
|-
| 959
| 959
| data-sort-value="XXX,1839" | (1839)
| data-sort-value="1000,014" | X No. 14
| data-sort-value="723,18" | VII/2, 3No. 18
| Piano Sonata, D 959
| data-sort-value="key A major" | A major
| data-sort-value="1828-09-01" | September1828
| Allegro – Andantino – Scherzo – Allegretto (partly based on 2nd movement of )
|-
| 960
| 960
| data-sort-value="XXX,1839" | (1839)
| data-sort-value="1000,015" | X No. 15
| data-sort-value="723,19" | VII/2, 3No. 19
| Piano Sonata, D 960
| data-sort-value="key B-flat major" | B major
| data-sort-value="1828-09-01" | September1828
| Molto moderato – Andante sostenuto – Scherzo – Allegro ma non troppo
|-
| 961
| data-sort-value="999.0452" | 452
| data-sort-value="ZZZZ" |

| data-sort-value="ZZZZ" |

| data-sort-value="ZZZZ" |

| data-sort-value="ZZZZ" |

| data-sort-value="ZZZZ" |

| data-sort-value="ZZZZ" |

| See 
|-
| 962
| 962
| data-sort-value="XXX,1890" | (1890)
| data-sort-value="2104,032" | XXI, 4No. 32
| data-sort-value="109,010" | I, 9No. 10& Anh. 4
| Tantum ergo, D 962
| data-sort-value="key E-flat major" | E major
| data-sort-value="1828-10-01" | October1828
| data-sort-value="Text by Aquinas, Thomas, Tantum ergo 6" | Text by Aquinas (other settings: , 461, 730, 739, 750 and Anh. I/17); For satbSATB and orchestra; Sketch in AGA XIV No. 22
|-
| 963
| 963
| data-sort-value="XXX,1890" | (1890)
| data-sort-value="2104,033" | XXI, 4No. 33
| data-sort-value="108,00" | I, 8
| Intende voci, a.k.a. Offertory, D 963, or Aria for tenor with choir
| data-sort-value="key B-flat major" | B major
| data-sort-value="1828-10-01" | October1828
| data-sort-value="Text: Psalm 05:3–4a" | Text: Psalm 5:3–4a, offertory for the Friday after Oculi Sunday; For tSATB and orchestra
|- id="D 964"
| 964
| data-sort-value="999.09480964" | 948
| data-sort-value="154,1849-0" | 154p(1849)
| data-sort-value="1600,002" | XVINo. 2
| data-sort-value="ZZZZ" |

| data-sort-value="ZZZZ" |

| data-sort-value="text Herr, unser Gott! erhore unser Flehen" | Herr, unser Gott! erhöre unser Flehen
| data-sort-value="ZZZZ" |

| See , 2nd version
|-
| 965
| 965
| data-sort-value="129,1830-0" | 129p(1830)
| data-sort-value="2010,569" | XX, 10No. 569
| data-sort-value="414,00" | IV, 14
| data-sort-value="Hirt auf dem Felsen, Der" | Der Hirt auf dem Felsen
| data-sort-value="text Wenn auf dem hochsten Fels ich steh" | Wenn auf dem höchsten Fels ich steh
| data-sort-value="1828-10-01" | October1828
| data-sort-value="Text by Muller, Wilhelm and Varnhagen von Ense, Karl August, Wenn auf dem hochsten Fels ich steh" | Text by Müller, W., and Varnhagen von Ense; For voice, clarinet and piano
|-
| data-sort-value="957.14" | 957No.14
| data-sort-value="965.1" | 965A
| data-sort-value="XXX,1829" | (1829)
| data-sort-value="2009,567" | XX, 9No. 567
| data-sort-value="414,00" | IV, 14
| data-sort-value="Taubenpost, Die" | Die Taubenpost
| data-sort-value="text Ich hab' eine Brieftaub in meinem Sold" | Ich hab' eine Brieftaub in meinem Sold
| data-sort-value="1828-10-01" | October1828
| data-sort-value="Text by Seidl, Johann Gabriel, Ich hab' eine Brieftaub in meinem Sold" | Text by Seidl; Was  No. 14
|-
| data-sort-value="999.09652" |
| data-sort-value="965.2" | 965B
| data-sort-value="ZZZZ" |
| data-sort-value="ZZZZ" |
| data-sort-value="802,15" | VIII, 2Nos. 15–16
| Fugal exercises, D 965B
| data-sort-value="ZZZZ" |
| data-sort-value="1828-11-04" | November1828
| Partly similar to 
|}

Lists of compositions by Franz Schubert
Compositions by Franz Schubert
Schubert